Glyphotaelius pellucidus is a species of insect belonging to the family Limnephilidae.

It is native to Europe and Northern America.

References

Trichoptera
Insects described in 1783